Harvey Jay Mason Jr. (born June 3, 1968) is an American record producer, songwriter, film producer, and current CEO of The Recording Academy. He has written and produced songs for artists including Aretha Franklin, Michael Jackson, Deniece Williams, Justin Timberlake, Britney Spears, Chris Brown, EXO, Red Velvet, Kim Jong-hyun, Taemin and NCT. In addition, he has produced music for television and films, including Dreamgirls (with Beyoncé and Jennifer Hudson), Sparkle (with Whitney Houston), Pitch Perfect (with Hailee Steinfeld and Anna Kendrick), Sing (with Reese Witherspoon, Scarlett Johansson and Tori Kelly), Straight Outta Compton (with Dr. Dre and Ice Cube), and The Wiz Live! (with Mary J. Blige and Neyo). He was elected as the chairman of The Recording Academy in June 2019, became its interim president and CEO on January 16, 2020, and then assumed the permanent role of CEO on May 13, 2021.

Biography 

Mason Jr. was born into a musical family. His father, jazz drummer Harvey Mason Sr., and mother Sally Mason, both attended the Berklee College of Music in Boston. Harvey moved with his family to Los Angeles as a child and followed his father to many recording sessions with such greats as Quincy Jones, the Brothers Johnson and Herbie Hancock. Mason Jr. penned his first song at the age of eight for Grover Washington Jr. titled "Love Makes It Better".

After attending the University of Arizona on a basketball scholarship from 1986 to 1990 and playing in the 1988 Final Four, he began working as a songwriter/record producer. Some early work included tracks for British pop artist Michelle Gayle's album "Sensational" in 1997 and the jazz/soul duo Imprompt2. He co-produced the jazz album "Ratamacue" with his father, Harvey Mason in 1997. In addition he worked with Mason Sr.'s group Fourplay and produced the track "Sexual Healing" featuring El DeBarge in 1998.

In 1997, Mason Jr. also penned the track "Truthfully" which caught the attention of record producer, Rodney Jerkins. The track was produced for Brandy's 1998 album "Never Say Never". Mason Jr. then worked with Jerkins over the next three years on projects including "Say My Name" by Destiny's Child, "It's Not Right, But It's Okay" by Whitney Houston, and "He Wasn't Man Enough" by Toni Braxton. He also worked on the album Invincible by Michael Jackson.

The Underdogs 

In 2000, Mason Jr. co-wrote the track "I Like Them Girls" with Damon Thomas for Tyrese's album "2000 Watts". The success of the song led to a partnership and the formation of Underdog Entertainment. The Underdogs produced R&B and pop hits like "How You Gonna Act Like That" by Tyrese,  "Gots Ta Be" by B2K, "O" by Omarion, "More To Life" by Stacie Orrico, "Sorry 2004" by Ruben Studdard, and "No Air" by Jordin Sparks and Chris Brown. In 2001, he collaborated with British designer and former member of the Spice Girls Victoria Beckham on her debut album including tracks like "Girlfriend" and some B-sides. In 2004, The Underdogs signed a label deal through BMG under Clive Davis and created Underdog Music Publishing, a joint venture with Rondor/ Universal Music. In 2006, The Underdogs produced the soundtrack to the motion picture "Dreamgirls" which won the Critic's Choice Award in 2007 for best movie soundtrack. After a three-year hiatus, The Underdogs reunited in 2011 to produce "Up 2 You" for Chris Brown's album "F.A.M.E.". The Underdogs wrote and produced the song "The Living Proof" performed by Mary J. Blige for the movie "The Help". The Underdogs wrote and produced the second single from Chris Brown's album Fortune titled "Turn Up the Music". In 2012 The Underdogs produced the vocals for the film Pitch Perfect, starring Anna Kendrick and Brittany Snow. In 2014, they produced South Korean girl group Girls' Generation's hit "Mr. Mr." & its labelmate Exo's "Overdose", as well as the music for biopic "Get on Up" about the life of James Brown. In 2015, The Underdogs produced the music for the sequel to the moderately successful "Pitch Perfect" movie, "Pitch Perfect 2" and the highly acclaimed film "Straight Outta Compton" about the rap group N.W.A.

Harvey Mason Media 

Mason Jr. formed his independent company Harvey Mason Media in 2008. It encompasses his film and record productions, music publishing, and website ventures. Record productions include the 2008 releases of Chris Brown, "Superhuman" from the album Exclusive, Britney Spears', "Mannequin" from the album Circus and Jennifer Hudson's, "You Pulled Me Through" from her self-titled debut album. He produced the title track "I Look To You" along with Tricky Stewart and the cover of "Song for You" along with Stargate for Whitney Houston's 2009 album "I Look To You". In 2010, Mason Jr. produced the updated version of "One Shining Moment" featuring Jennifer Hudson for CBS Sports to be featured during the Final Four. Mason Jr. produced and worked as A&R on Toni Braxton's Pulse. In 2011, Mason Jr. produced the first single "Where You At" along with R. Kelly for Jennifer Hudson's album "I Remember Me"

Harvey Mason Media produced the feature film More than a Game in 2008. The movie documents the rise of LeBron James and his high school teammates from their early AAU basketball days to the high school national championship stage. The film premiered at the Toronto International Film Festival in 2008, where it won first runner up to best film, "Slumdog Millionaire". Lions Gate Films distributed the film, which was released during the fall of 2009. Harvey Mason Media and Interscope Records distributed the soundtrack album titled "Music Inspired by More Than a Game". More than a Game was nominated for best documentary at the 2010 NAACP Image Awards and the Independent Spirit Awards.

Mason Jr. appeared on the 2011 season of American Idol as a mentor/producer, working with Pia Toscano and Jacob Lusk and worked as a mentor/producer on the 2013 season of The X Factor USA. He has also made numerous appearances on the reality series Braxton Family Values on the We TV network starring Toni Braxton and Tamar Braxton.

In 2012, Mason Jr. was the last producer to work with Whitney Houston when he produced the songs "His Eye Is on the Sparrow" and "Celebrate" for the movie Sparkle.

Following the success of Pitch Perfect 2, Get On Up, and Straight Outta Compton, Harvey served as music producer for the NBC broadcast of The Wiz Live! which aired on December 3, 2015, and he produced over 50 songs for the animated musical SING from Universal/Illumination Entertainment which was released on December 3, 2016. SING received two Golden Globe Awards nominations for Best Animated Feature Film and Best Original Song for the song "Faith".

In 2017, Mason Jr. served as executive music producer for Pitch Perfect 3 – the final installment of the blockbuster Universal Pictures franchise, as well as the musical reworking of the 1980s classic Valley Girl (film) for MGM and USA Network's Unsolved, a scripted true crime series based on the murder investigations of Tupac Shakur and Notorious B.I.G. He also served as composer and executive music producer on director Anthony Mandler's feature debut Monster which was nominated for the 2018 Grand Jury Prize at Sundance.

In March 2018, Billboard announced that Harvey Mason Jr. joined the advisory board of Tunedly, an online recording studio for songwriters.

Most recently, Mason Jr. produced the music for NBC's Jesus Christ Superstar Live in Concert! which aired on April 1, 2018, and Bad Times at the El Royale for 20th Century Fox directed by Drew Goddard.

Hundredup 

In 2018, Mason Jr. founded and launched Hundredup, a record label, publishing company, and marketing company. The company's roster of artists includes:

 Brezy
 Matt Easton
 Caleon Fox
 Deap Vally

Recording Academy 

 Harvey Mason Jr is currently serving as the Chief Executive Officer of The Recording Academy, having assumed the role on May 13, 2021.

Grammy Foundation 

Mason Jr. was elected to the board of the directors for the Los Angeles chapter of The Recording Academy (National Academy of Record Arts and Sciences) in 2007 and the National Board of Trustees in 2009. He has participated in Grammy Foundation events including Grammy in the Schools, Grammy Camp and the Music Cares Foundation. Mason Jr. is the Chairperson of the National Advocacy Committee and Executive Co-chair of the Producers and Engineers Wing.

Basketball 

Mason Jr. played basketball throughout high school and college. As a guard on the Crescenta Valley High School team in La Crescenta, California he was selected to the All-CIF (California Interscholastic Federation) team in 1984, 1985 and 1986. He received a full-scholarship to the University of Arizona and played for Hall of Fame coach, Lute Olson. Mason Jr.'s teams won the Pac-10 title in 1988, 1989 and 1990 and played in the Final Four in 1988. Notable teammates include Steve Kerr (Chicago Bulls), Jud Buechler (Chicago Bulls), Bison Dele (Chicago Bulls), Sean Elliott (San Antonio Spurs) and Kenny Lofton (Major League Baseball six time all-star). Multiple knee surgeries sidelined Mason Jr.'s hope of a continuing basketball career. Most recently he has played in the NBA Entertainment League where he has been consistently selected to the all-star team. Mason Jr. serves on the National Leadership Council and the Board of Trustees for the University of Arizona.

Songwriting and music production highlights 
50 Cent featuring Brevi – "Be My Bitch"
Avant – "4 Minutes", "When It Hurts"
Babyface – "Cant Stop Now", "Loneliness"
Backstreet Boys – "Rush Over Me"
BoA – "CAMO"
Bob James – "Fly By"
Justin Bieber – "Catching Feelings"
E-17 – "I Miss You", "I'm Here For You"
Victoria Beckham – "Girlfriend", "Always Be My Baby"
Beyoncé – "Listen"
Jack Black & Cee-Lo – "Kung Fu Fighting"
Brandy – "Truthfully"
B2K – "Gots Ta Be"
B5 – "All Over Again, "What It Do", "Things I Would Do"
Dane Bowers – "Shut Up And Forget About It"
Tamar Braxton – "All The Way Home"
Toni Braxton – "He Wasn't Man Enough", "I Wanna Be (Your Baby)", "I Hate You", "Finally", "Hands Tied", "Hero", "Why Don't You Love Me", "Stay"
Chris Brown – "Ya Man Ain't Me", "Young Love", "Is This Love", "Take You Down", "Help Me", "Get At'Cha", "Nothin", "Lottery", "Superhuman", "Heart Ain't A Brain", Turn Up The Music, "Free Run"
Kelly Clarkson – "Thankful", "You Thought Wrong"
Javier – "Beautiful U R", "Biggest Mistake", "Slow Motion"
Deborah Cox – "If I Had One Wish", "U Need To Quit"
Craig David – "Take 'Em Off", "My Love Don't Stop"
Dream – "That's OK", "Promise Me"
Dreamgirls – Movie Soundtrack
EXO – "Overdose", "Moonlight", "Diamond", "Sign", "24/7"
EXO-CBX – Vroom Vroom
Jonghyun — "Hallelujah"
Fantasia – "Ain't Gonna Beg", "This Is Me", "Always on My Mind"
Fifth Harmony – "Sledgehammer"
Fourplay – "Sexual Healing", "Love TKO" (featuring Ruben Studdard)
Aretha Franklin featuring Fantasia – "Put You Up on Game"
Aretha Franklin featuring Mary J. Blige – "Never Gonna Break My Faith"
Ginuwine – "Good For Nothing", "Please You"
Girls' Generation – "Mr.Mr."
Whitney Houston – "I Look To You", "Song For You"
Jennifer Hudson – "And I Am Telling You I'm Not Going", "Love You I Do", "Where You At", "If This Isn't Love", "My Heart", "You Pulled Me Through", "Invisible"
R.L. Huggar – "Good Man", "Model Chick"
Human Nature – The Christmas Album, "Christmas Without You"
Tiffany Hwang – "Heartbreak Hotel"
Lyfe Jennings – "Cops Up"
Joe – "Ain't Nothin' Like Me", "Priceless", "Beautiful"
JoJo – "Baby, It's You", "Never Say Goodbye"
Donell Jones – "Ooh Na Na", "Cuttin Me Off"
K-Ci & JoJo – "Love Me Carefully"
Tynisha Keli – "Walls Up"
Dave Koz – "Whisper in Your Ear"
John Legend – "Fall From Grace"
Leona Lewis – "I Know Who I Am"
Luke and Q – "My Turn"
Mario –  "What Your Name Is", "Holla Back", "Could U Be", "How Could You", "I'm The One", "If I Hurt You"
Marques Houston – "Naked", "Always & Forever"
Mary J. Blige – "Never Gonna Break My Faith", "Living Proof"
Jessica Mauboy – "Fight For You", "Here For Me"
Brian McKnight – "Shoulda Woulda Coulda", "Played Yourself", "Stay Or Let It Go"
Katharine McPhee – "Do What You Do"
Mishon – "Text Me", "Life Guard", "Just A Kiss"
Monica – "Sideline Ho", "My Everything"
Musiq Soulchild – "Today"
NCT – "Faded In My Last Song"
NCT 127 – "Limitless", "Sit Down!", "White Night"
NLT – "That Girl"
Nina – "What If"
Olivia – "You Got The Damn Thing"
Omarion – "O", "Midnight", "Im Try'na"
Stacie Orrico – "(There's Gotta Be) More to Life", "I Promise"
Produce 101 (Season 2) – "Hands On Me"
Calvin Richardson – "Not Like This"
SHINee – "Symptoms", "Lipstick", "Rescue"
Jordin Sparks – "No Air" – featuring Chris Brown, "Don't Let It Go To Your Head"
Britney Spears – "Mannequin"
Spice Girls – "Let Love Lead The Way"
Ruben Studdard – "Sorry 2004", "Change Me", "Get Loose", "Love TKO" (Fourplay)
Taeyang – "I Will"
Tank – "Please Don't Go", "My Body", My Heart", "Wedding Song", "If You Dream", "Sex Music", "Beautiful", "You Mean That Much", "Your My Star"
Justin Timberlake – "Still on My Brain"
TGT – "No Fun, "I Need", "Weekend Love", "Explode", "Our House"
TVXQ! - "Apology”
Tyrese – "I Like Them Girls", "How You Gonna Act Like That", "One", "I Ain't Tryna", "Better To Know", "Come Back To Me Shawty", "With Me"
J. Valentine – "She's Worth The Trouble", "Wassup", "Heartbreak"
Luther Vandross – "If I Was The One"
Luther Vandross and Elton John – "Anyone Who Had A Heart"
Red Velvet – "Butterflies", “Rainbow Halo”
Charlie Wilson – "What If I'm The One", "Homeless", "Can't Live Without You"
Elliott Yamin – "Doorway", "Always"
Ya Boy – "We Ready" (from "More Than A Game" soundtrack)
Jackson Yi – "Nothing to Lose"
Jane Zhang – "Pull Me Up"

References

External links 
Harvey Mason Media
Underdog Entertainment
Harvey Mason Sr.
More Than A Game
Harvey Mason Jr. on More Than a Game
Mason's Talents Not Limited To Basketball
French Underdogs Interview on SoulRnB.com

1968 births
Living people
Record producers from Massachusetts
African-American songwriters
Songwriters from Massachusetts
Film producers from Massachusetts
Musicians from Boston
Arizona Wildcats men's basketball players
Basketball players from Massachusetts
Film producers from Arizona
American men's basketball players
Presidents of The Recording Academy
21st-century African-American people
20th-century African-American people